Louanne Katraine (callsign "Kat") is a fictional character from the reimagined Battlestar Galactica television series, portrayed by Luciana Carro.

Character arc

Prior to the show (and unknown to the audience), Sasha Billings is a drug-runner. Fortunate enough to be among the survivors of the ragtag fleet, she takes the name of her roommate, Louanne Katraine, to get her through background checks, which allows her to join a group of volunteer pilots trained by Starbuck. A natural, she quickly becomes a rival to Starbuck. As fatigue and stress mount, Kat turns to stimulants to keep her senses sharp; she overdoses and is temporarily hospitalized.

After Starbuck and Apollo are transferred to the battlestar Pegasus, Kat seems to act as the Galacticas de facto CAG, and in the months after their return, the rivalry between Kat and Starbuck intensifies. After settlement of planet New Caprica, Kat is promoted to captain and becomes the Galactica's CAG; she and Racetrack leads the decoy operation that allow the rescue of the civilian population. After the escape, Apollo is reinstated as CAG; Kat and Starbuck become squadron leaders.

When the fleet attempts passage through a highly-radioactive star cluster, Starbuck discovers Kat's past and threatens to reveal it. On the final jump, Kat remains in the cluster long enough to help her assigned ship make it through. She succeeds, but receives a fatal dose of radiation. Admiral Adama visits her deathbed, and reinstates her as honorary CAG.

Behind the scenes

Like many characters in the series, Kat was intended to be a one-off, but Carro's performance impressed showrunner Ronald D. Moore and her role was expanded. Kat is the only such character to have an episode ("The Passage") where she is the primary focus. A deleted scene from the episode "Maelstrom" would have shown the deceased Kat appearing alongside Starbuck's viper, encouraging her to accept her fate by telling her, "I've got your six." Although it was not made explicit in the scene, Moore explained in his commentary on "The Passage," that Adama looked on Kat (and by extension, all his favored pilots), like Starbuck, as an adopted daughter of sorts.

See also 
 List of Battlestar Galactica (2004 television series) episodes

Footnotes

External links 
 Louanne Katraine at the Battlestar Wiki

Battlestar Galactica (2004 TV series) characters
Fictional space pilots
Fictional women soldiers and warriors
Fictional lieutenants
Fictional military captains
Television characters introduced in 2004